Vinton is an unincorporated community in Cowley County, Kansas, United States.

History
Vinton had a post office from 1888 until 1926.

Education
The community is served by Dexter USD 471 public school district.

References

Further reading

External links
 Cowley County maps: Current, Historic, KDOT

Unincorporated communities in Cowley County, Kansas
Unincorporated communities in Kansas